Hadrien Feraud (born August 16, 1984 in Paris) is a French jazz bassist.

Biography
Hadrien Feraud was born into a very musical family. His parents -- who are also musicians -- immersed him at a very young age in various musical environments: rock 'n roll, blues, funk, R&B, new wave, and, of course, jazz. Hadrien began studying guitar at age 8, taking lessons from his father. He also had a deep interest in film scores. By the time he was 10 he started picking up bass lines from Earth, Wind & Fire, music of the Motown era, The Police, Eric Clapton, Stevie Wonder, Michael Jackson, Prince, Chic, Donald Fagen, ZZ Top, Alanis Morissette, Sheryl Crow, Kool and the Gang, Don Blackman and later also Weather Report, Chick Corea, John McLaughlin and Herbie Hancock. But at first he was actually more interested in playing drums until he received a copy of The Birthday Concert by Jaco Pastorius at age 12. After hearing Jaco Pastorius everything changed. Hadrien immersed himself in profound studies of electric bass, analyzing the techniques of Jaco Pastorius, James Jamerson, Bernard Edwards, Nathan East, Christian McBride, Victor Bailey, Anthony Jackson, Skúli Sverrisson, Gary Willis, Matthew Garrison, Richard Bona, Linley Marthe and Jeff Berlin.  Hadrien's talent on bass has become widely known throughout the world.

Collaborations
Between 2003 and now, he has recorded and performed with many renowned musicians: John McLaughlin, Chick Corea, Lee Ritenour, Hiromi Uehara, Billy Cobham, Gino Vannelli, Jean-Luc Ponty, Bireli Lagrene, Dean Brown, Jada Pinkett Smith, Paco Sery, Matt Garrison, Thundercat, Kamasi Washington, Antonio Farao,  Otmaro Ruiz, Scott Kinsey, Marvin Smitty Smith, David Binney, Louis Cole, Walter Smith III, Gerald Clayton, West Coast Get Down, Virgil Donati, Cheick Tidiane Seck, Nguyên Lê, Jean-Pierre Como, Jean-Marie Ecay, Karim Ziad, Dominique Di Piazza, Gary Husband, André Ceccarelli, Dario Chiazzolino, Sylvain Luc and many others.

Work
Towards the end of 2004 Hadrien started composing works for his first solo project, in parallel to playing at several clubs and jams in the Paris scene.

In 2005 John McLaughlin invited Hadrien to contribute on two tracks ("For Jaco", "Senor CS") on his album "Industrial Zen".
This was a pivotal encounter for Hadrien.

In 2006 he finished recording his first solo album "Hadrien Feraud" together with guest musicians such as John McLaughlin, Biréli Lagrène, Flavio Boltro, Jean-Marie Ecay, Jean-Pierre Como, Marc Berthoumieux, Mokhtar Samba, Jim Grancamp, Jon Grancamp, Dominique Di Piazza, Thierry Eliez, Linley Marthe.

In 2007 he took part in Chick Corea's trio project. After that he went on tour in North America and Canada. A European tour followed in 2009, as a member of John McLaughlin and the 4th dimension (with Gary Husband on keyboards and Mark Mondesir on drums).

Hadrien Feraud arranged and produced Biréli Lagrène's album "Electric Side".

On Tour
2012 and 2013 touring in US and Europe with Dean Brown Band.

2013 touring with Chick Corea & The Vigil: Chick Corea (keys), Hadrien Feraud (bass) together with Marcus Gilmore on drums, saxophones, flute, bass clarinet and innovation from Tim Garland and guitarist Charles Altura.

2016 World Tour with Lee Ritenour
2017 World Toutr with Hiromi Uehara 
2018 Tour with Lee Ritenour.

Quotes
"Of course... Jaco influenced me. It is the reason why I wanted to become a musician!!" - Hadrien Feraud

"When I heard Jaco and Weather Report the first time, I fell in love. What I love in Jaco’s music are the feelings and images it creates in your mind"  Hadrien Feraud

"...for me, he’s the new Jaco [Pastorius]" - John McLaughlin

"Usually I do what everybody does; each time I hear something that is attractive to my ears, I pick it up when I can." - Hadrien Feraud

Basses and amps
 Ken Smith Basses Burner 5 String SIGNATURE Hadrien FERAUD (sponsored)
 Fodera Beez Elite 5-string (special manufacture)
 F Bass Fretless 5-string (sponsored) 
 Godin 5 Acc Fretless with Axon Midi system
 Ken Smith Basses GT 5-String
 1966 Fender Jazz Bass
 1973 Fender Precision Bass
 1967 Höfner
 Mayones "Jabba" Bass Signature Hadrien FERAUD (sponsored)

In September 2009, Hadrien and Ken Smith announced the creation of the "Hadrien Feraud Signature Burner", to be made in Japan by Hajime Hirose and SleekElite, under the direction of Ken Smith. Hand built models are scheduled to be released before the end of 2009, with mass-produced simplified models (no exotic tops or woods) to be released in early 2010. Early photographs show the bass with a buckeye burl top, maple neck, ebony fretboard and removable ebony ramp, and it will also featured the Ken Smith 18v preamp, with a Mid Switch for different tones and volume boost.

 Markbass SPONSORED System AMP
 Clubs : CMD102P + TRAVELER 102P
 Bigger than Club : F1 or SD800 on 2 cabinets 104HR Standard ( 8 X 10' )
 TC Electronic FX

Awards
 Down Beat Critics Poll "Rising Star Electric Bassist of the year" 2008
 Down Beat Critics Poll 2nd position in "Rising Star Electric Bass" 2009
 Bass Player Magazine "Readers Choice Award" Most Exciting new Player 2009
 Bassplayer Magazine cover 2017
 Bassiste Magazine cover 2018

Discography
 Industrial Zen / John McLaughlin 2006
 Hadrien Feraud / Hadrien Feraud 2007
 Brooklyn, Paris to Clearwater / Chick Corea 2007
 Official Pirate / John McLaughlin and the 4th Dimension 2007
 Floating Point / John McLaughlin 2008
 Bireli Electric Side / Biréli Lagrène 2008
 Christophe et Tony Raymond / Christophe et Tony Raymond 2009
 The Vigil / Chick Corea 2013
 Born in the 80's / Hadrien Feraud 2015
 Spirit Fingers / Greg Spero, Mike Mitchell, Dario Chiazzolino 2018

CD Reviews
Hadrien Feraud: "Hadrien Feraud"

References

External links

 Hadrien Feraud on Myspace (English)
 Announcement of Ken Smith Signature Burner model (with pictures) on Talkbass

1984 births
Living people
French bass guitarists
Male bass guitarists
Jazz fusion bass guitarists
Jazz fusion arrangers
Musicians from Paris
21st-century bass guitarists
21st-century French male musicians
Male jazz musicians
French male guitarists